Siuna Airport  is an airport serving Siuna, Nicaragua. The airport is in the southern part of the town.

There are nearby hills to the north and east.

Airlines and destinations

See also

Transport in Nicaragua
List of airports in Nicaragua

References

External links
 OurAirports - Siuna
 OpenStreetMap - Siuna
 FallingRain - Siuna Airport
 

Airports in Nicaragua
North Caribbean Coast Autonomous Region